Oberthueria is a genus of moths of the Endromidae family. The genus was previously placed in the subfamily Oberthueriinae of the Bombycidae family.

Species
Oberthueria caeca (Oberthür, 1880)
Oberthueria falcigera (Butler, 1878)
Oberthueria formosibia Matsumura, 1927
Oberthueria jiatongae Zolotuhin & Xing Wang, 2013
Oberthueria lunwan Zolotuhin & Xing Wang, 2013
Oberthueria yandu Zolotuhin & Xing Wang, 2013

References

 

Endromidae
Oberthueria (moth)